Dorcadion cingulatoides is a species of beetle in the family Cerambycidae. It was described by Breuning in 1946.

See also 
Dorcadion

References

cingulatoides
Beetles described in 1946